is a railway station in the city of Nikkō, Tochigi, Japan, operated by the private railway operator Tobu Railway. The station is numbered "TN-56".

Lines

Station layout
The station consists of two island platforms connected by a footbridge.

Platforms

Adjacent stations

History

It was renamed  on 19 March 1922, and Kinugawa-Onsen on 19 February 1927.

From 17 March 2012, station numbering was introduced on all Tobu lines, with Kinugawa-Onsen Station becoming "TN-55". It was renumbered "TN-56" on 21 April 2017 ahead of the opening of Tobu World Square Station (TN-55) in July 2017.

The turntable was acquired from the JR West Miyoshi Station in Hiroshima Prefecture.

Passenger statistics
In fiscal 2019, the station was used by an average of 2731 passengers daily (boarding passengers only).

Surrounding area

 Kinugawa River
 Kinugawa Onsen hot spring area
 Tobu World Square theme park
 Kinugawa Onsen Post Office

See also
 List of railway stations in Japan

References

External links

  

Railway stations in Tochigi Prefecture
Stations of Tobu Railway
Railway stations in Japan opened in 1919
Tobu Kinugawa Line
Nikkō, Tochigi